The following highways are numbered 864:

Canada
 Alberta Highway 864

Israel
 Route 864 (Israel)

United States